Leucopis americana is a species of fly in the family Chamaemyiidae.

References

Further reading

External links

 Diptera.info

Chamaemyiidae
Insects described in 1921